Carlton Your Doorman is a 1980 American television pilot for an animated spin-off of the live-action sitcom Rhoda (1974–78) that was never picked up as a series. It originally aired as a "CBS Special Presentation" on May 21, 1980 and has never been rebroadcast.

Synopsis
Carlton is a New York City doorman and a misfit who seeks to better himself and his position in society. In the pilot episode, Carlton seeks a replacement for his boss's wife's dog, Punkin, who died while in his care. He tries everything to replace the dog so his boss does not find out.

It was revealed in this episode that Carlton was a relatively young man, with shoulder-length blond hair and mustache. He also has a gray cat named Gringo.

Production
The episode relates the adventures of Carlton, the Doorman (voiced by Lorenzo Music), the previously off-screen character from Rhoda who was heard via the intercom but almost never seen (except only his arm would occasionally appear from doors and he was once shown dancing while wearing a gorilla mask). It was produced by MTM Enterprises and was the only animated production from MTM, although The Duck Factory – a sitcom set in an animation production company – included cartoon segments, and the closing credits of many MTM series included animated clothing and accessories superimposed on Mimsie the Cat.

It is also one of the last animated pilots to use a laugh track, which was a common practice in the 1960s and 1970s.

Voice cast
 Lorenzo Music as Carlton, the Doorman
 Jack Somack as Charles Shaftman, Carlton's boss
 Lucille Meredith as Mrs. Shaftman, Charles' wife
 Lurene Tuttle as Carlton's mother
 Kay Cole as Darlene, Carlton's girlfriend

Home media
Shout! Factory released this episode as a bonus feature on Rhoda – Season Five: The Final Season DVD set on October 17, 2017.

Accolades
Primetime Emmy Awards
 1980: Primetime Emmy Award for Outstanding Animated Program – Carlton Your Doorman

References

External links
 
 

1980 American television episodes
1980 television specials
1980s American television specials
American animated television spin-offs
Television pilots not picked up as a series
Television series by MTM Enterprises
Emmy Award-winning programs